William Butterworth may refer to:

William Butterworth (businessman) (1864–1936), American businessman and early Deere & Company president
William John Butterworth (1801–1856), English colonel and Governor of the Straits Settlements
William Walton Butterworth (1903–1975), American diplomat
W. E. Butterworth (born 1929), American author, also known as W. E. B. Griffin